Darul Uloom Raheemiyyah is an Islamic seminary in Bandipore, Jammu and Kashmir. It was established in 1979 by Rahmatullah Mir Qasmi, an alumnus of Darul Uloom Deoband. It is regarded as the biggest Islamic seminary of Kashmir.

History
Darul Uloom Raheemiyyah was established by Rahmatullah Mir Qasmi in 1979. It follows the methodology of Darul Uloom Deoband.

Faculty
 Nazir Ahmad Qasmi, Grand Mufti of Darul Uloom Raheemiyyah is one of the founding members of All India Muslim Personal Law Board. His fiqhi answers appear regularly on the Friday issue of Kashmir Uzma, a sister project of Greater Kashmir.
 Mufti Mohammad Ishaq Nazki, author of Hamare Pyare Makki Aaqa.

References

Deobandi Islamic universities and colleges
Islamic education in India
Madrasas in India
Educational institutions established in 1979
Islamic universities and colleges in India
1979 establishments in Jammu and Kashmir